Mooreville is an unincorporated community in Falls County, Texas, United States. It is located just off Highway 7 four miles northwest of Chilton on Farm Road 2643. Never incorporated, Mooreville posted a population of about 95 in 2000 after peaking at 180 in the late 19th century. The post office was discontinued in 1906, and the school consolidated with Chilton in 1950.

References

Unincorporated communities in Texas
Unincorporated communities in Falls County, Texas